Criteo is an advertising company that provides online display advertisements. The company was founded and is headquartered in Paris, France.

History
Criteo was founded in Paris, France, in 2005 by Jean-Baptiste Rudelle, Franck Le Ouay and Romain Niccoli. Criteo spent the first four years focused on R&D, and launched its first product in April 2008. In 2010, Criteo opened an office in Silicon Valley. In 2012, Criteo opened its new headquarters in Paris, France.

On April 7, 2011, Criteo announced that it hired Greg Coleman as president. Previously, Coleman served as president and chief revenue officer of The Huffington Post and executive vice president of global sales for Yahoo!.

In October 2013, the firm completed an initial public offering (IPO), raising US$251 million.

On 1 January 2016, Rudelle became the executive chairman, while Eric Eichmann, who was the president and chief operating officer (COO), was promoted to be the chief executive officer. In June 2016, Criteo alleged Steelhouse, a rival ad tech company, that the latter had falsely taken credit for user visits to retailers' web pages in a lawsuit. Steelhouse countersued, alleging Criteo of false advertising and unfair competition. After an injunction requested by Criteo was denied in October 2016, both parties chose to mutually dropped their lawsuits in November 2016. On 4 October 2016, Criteo acquired HookLogic, a retail exchange, ad server and attribution company focused squarely on retailers, strengthening its ecommerce serving capabilities.

In October 2017, Criteo appointed Mollie Spilman as COO.

With the implementation of Intelligent Tracking Prevention (ITP) feature from Apple's Safari 11 onwards in September 2017, Criteo's revenue was reduced by $25 million in 2017. However, Criteo reportedly was working on “sustainable solution for the long-term” at the end of 2017, and had redesign its "platform architecture" since. Criteo was also impacted by the perception that the General Data Protection Regulation would negatively affect the company.

In April 2018, Rudelle returned as the CEO, with Eichmann being his advisor. Under Rudelle, Criteo slowly transited from a single product (web advertising) to multi-product platform, which included in-app and email advertising. Criteo's revenue did not grow in 2018, and was down 1%.

On 19 October 2019, Megan Clarken was appointed as the new CEO, taking over from Rudelle. Clarken would continue Criteo's transformation plan.

Product
Criteo's product is a form of display advertising, which displays interactive banner advertisements, generated based on the online browsing preferences and behaviour for each customer. The solution operates on a pay per click/cost per click (CPC) basis.

In September 2010, Criteo debuted its self-service cost-per-click (CPC) bidding platform that lets advertisers place bids on display retargeting campaigns and see changes and optimize campaigns in real-time. During 2020 Criteo launched a traffic generation product, which allows advertisers to advertise using purchase intent data, and it also introduced a self-service ad platform for its Criteo Retail Media division that allows advertisers to purchase media space on retailers’ websites.

Funding
Criteo secured a total of $17 million in funding, with €3 million in a first institutional round in March 2006 coming from French private equity firm AGF and Elaia Partners, and €9 million in a second round in January 2008 led by Index Ventures.

In May 2010, Criteo raised a further $7 million of funding from Bessemer Venture Partners,.

Privacy

In September 2010, Criteo began a campaign regarding the use of the popular retargeting and its impact on consumer privacy. The campaign aimed to reassure consumers about personalized retargeting and data-driven marketing tactics.

The company denies it relies on personally identifiable information (PII) and doesn't track identifiable information, no data is shared with advertisers or publishers and no third-party data used for targeting purposes. Retargeting only uses anonymous information from the merchant's site.

In 2019, Privacy International filed a complaint against Criteo, citing that it wouldn't respect the European GDPR.

See also
Ad Tracking
Website visitor tracking

References

Further reading

External links 
 

Online advertising
Marketing companies established in 2005
Companies based in Paris
Companies listed on the Nasdaq
2005 establishments in France